Francis Berthelot (born 27 July 1946 in Paris) is a French science fiction writer. He won the Grand Prix de l'Imaginaire three times and the Prix Rosny-Aîné once. He is an alumnus of École Polytechnique.

Bibliography

Novels

La Lune noire d'Orion 1980
La Ville au fond de l’œil 1986
 Rivage des intouchables 1990
 La maison brisée 1999
 Le serpent à collerette 2003

Series/Cycles 
Khanaor 
Solstice de fer 1983
Equinoxe de cendre 1983

Le rêve du démiurge 
 L'ombre d'un soldat 1994
 Le jongleur interrompu 1996
 Mélusath 1999
 Le jeu du cormoran 2001
 Nuit de colère 2003
 Hadès Palace 2005
 Le Petit Cabaret des morts

External links
Official site (In French)

1946 births
French science fiction writers
École Polytechnique alumni
Living people
French male novelists